Dinnyuy Kongnyuy (born 24 January 1988 in Kadji, Jakiri Kumbo province) is a professional Cameroonian footballer who plays for Komenda.

Career
Kongnyuy began his career in Kadji Sports Academy and joined Domžale in July 2008, where he did not play any matches and left the club. On 8 January 2009 he moved to Celje. In the summer of 2012, he joined Slovenian top flight side Triglav Kranj.

References

External links
PrvaLiga profile 
Nogomania profile 

1988 births
Living people
Cameroonian footballers
Association football midfielders
Kadji Sports Academy players
Cameroonian expatriate footballers
Expatriate footballers in Slovenia
Cameroonian expatriate sportspeople in Slovenia
NK Domžale players
NK Celje players
NK IB 1975 Ljubljana players
NK Triglav Kranj players
NK Ivančna Gorica players
Slovenian PrvaLiga players